John Dewitt Macomber (born January 13, 1928) is the principal of JDM Investment Group and was the president of the Export-Import Bank of the United States from 1989 to 1992. He was born in Rochester, New York. He was a senior partner at McKinsey & Co. until 1973 and chairman and CEO of Celanese Corporation from 1973 until 1986. He exited when the company was acquired by Hoechst AG to become the largest chemical company. Celanese had been ahead of its time in stock buybacks, and Macomber was especially proud that 20% of company stock was "owned by middle managers and ordinary folk who are extraordinarily well off". During the 13 years he led the company, the stock increased in value by 10 times, from $24.50 to $245.

Macomber is also chairman of the Council for Excellence in Government, Rand McNally and Company, and vice chairman of the Atlantic Council. He has retired from serving on the board of directors of Lehman Brothers, Bristol-Myers Squibb Company, The Brown Group, Inc., Chase Manhattan Bank, RJR Nabisco, Pilkington Ltd., and Xerox Corporation. In addition, Macomber served on the Lincoln Center board and the International Chamber of Commerce.

Personal life
Macomber was born in Rochester, New York, and served in the US Air Force for two years. He had two older brothers, William Butts Macomber and Robert Macomber. He graduated from Phillips Academy, Yale University in 1950, and Harvard Business School in 1952.

References
 Trustee Emeritus: John D. Macomber '46. Phillips Academy. Accessed 2011-03-01.

Specific

1928 births
Living people
Atlantic Council
American chief executives of Fortune 500 companies
Harvard Business School alumni
McKinsey & Company people
Yale University alumni
Lehman Brothers people
Phillips Academy alumni
Businesspeople from Rochester, New York